The discography of Swedish singer Robin Bengtsson consists of 29 singles. Six music singles that charted after he had performed them during his participation in Idol 2008. And one EP named Under My Skin, released in 2014 by the record label Merion Music Group. Two of the songs, "Constellation Prize" and "I Can't Go On" competed in Melodifestivalen. Constellation Prize placed fifth in 2016, and I Can't Go On won the 2017 edition of the contest and was Sweden's entry for the Eurovision Song Contest 2017 in Ukraine.

Extended plays

Singles

As lead artist

As featured artist

Promotional singles

Notes

References

Discographies of Swedish artists